Colles may refer to:
Abraham Colles (1773–1843), Irish professor of anatomy
Christopher Colles (1739–1816), engineer and inventor
Colles' fracture, a fracture of the distal radius bone
Fascia of Colles, serves to bind down the muscles of the root of the penis
Plural of collis, a term used in planetary nomenclature to refer to small hills or knobs